Vražné is a municipality and village in Nový Jičín District in the Moravian-Silesian Region of the Czech Republic. It has about 900 inhabitants.

Administrative parts
The village of Hynčice and the hamlet of Emauzy are administrative parts of Vražné.

Notable people
Gregor Mendel (1822–1884), Austrian biologist and founder of the modern science of genetics

References

Villages in Nový Jičín District